The Ideal College of Arts and Sciences is located in Kakinada, Andhra Pradesh, India. The Ideal Junior College and the Ideal College of Arts and Sciences, are the result of work by educationists including P.V.N. Raju, Sri P.V. Ramana Murthy,  P. Chiranjeevini Kumari, D.N. AppaRao, N.S.R. Sastry and Sri Mandalika Satyanarayana.

Motto
The motto of the institution is "Vidya Darsaha - Viswa Sreyaha" - The ideal of Education is the Universal Welfare.

History
The Society got permission from the government in 1970 for a Junior College and 1974 for the opening of the Degree College. The college now has B.A, B.Com and B.Sc with Computer Science, Electronics, Medical Lab Technology, Bio-Chemistry, Bio-Technology, Micro Biology at graduate level and M.Sc. Applied Chemistry, M.Sc. Organic Chemistry, M.Sc. Analytical Chemistry, Master Business Administration (MBA), M.A.Economics, M.Sc. Applied Mathematics, Master of Computer Applications (MCA), M.Sc.Computer Sciences at postgraduate level.

Dr. PVN Raju Vidya Pranganam
The Junior College and Degree College are on "Dr. PVN Raju Vidya Pranganam", Samalkota Road, whereas Engineering and postgraduate courses run in Narasanna Nagar, Vidyut Nagar, Kakinada.

Ideal Institute of Technology
The Ideal Institute of Technology was established under the aegis of the governing body of the Ideal College of Arts and Sciences in 2009.  It has permission from the All India Council for Technical Education, New Delhi and is affiliated to JNTUK, Kakinada.

The college offers five branches - ECE, CSE, MECH, EEE and CIVIL.

Colleges in Andhra Pradesh
Education in Kakinada
Educational institutions established in 1974
1970 establishments in Andhra Pradesh